Mariaville is a town in Hancock County, Maine, United States. The population was 472 at the 2020 census.

History
Mariaville was incorporated in 1836. The town was named for Maria Matilda Bingham, the second daughter of William Bingham, a wealthy nonresident slave owner and early U.S. Senator from Pennsylvania.

Geography

Demographics

2010 census
As of the 2010 census, there were 513 people, 208 households, and 142 families living in the town. The racial makeup of the town was 97.3% White, 0.4% African American, 1.2% Native American, 0.4% Asian, 0.2% from other races, and 0.6% from two or more races. Hispanic or Latino of any race were 1.8% of the population.

There were 208 households, of which 33.2% had children under the age of 18 living with them, 56.7% were married couples living together, 5.3% had a female householder with no husband present, 6.3% had a male householder with no wife present, and 31.7% were non-families. 21.6% of all households were made up of individuals, and 3.3% had someone living alone who was 65 years of age or older. The average household size was 2.47 and the average family size was 2.87.

The median age in the town was 43.5 years. 22.2% of residents were under the age of 18; 7.6% were between the ages of 18 and 24; 22.7% were from 25 to 44; 39.8% were from 45 to 64; and 7.8% were 65 years of age or older. The gender makeup of the town was 54.2% male and 45.8% female.

2000 census
As of the census of 2000, there were 414 people, 149 households, and 105 families living in the town.  The population density was 10.6 people per square mile (4.1/km2).  There were 318 housing units at an average density of 8.2 per square mile (3.2/km2).  The racial makeup of the town was 99.52% White and 0.48% Asian.

There were 149 households, out of which 40.3% had children under the age of 18 living with them, 60.4% were married couples living together, 4.7% had a female householder with no husband present, and 29.5% were non-families. 22.1% of all households were made up of individuals, and 2.0% had someone living alone who was 65 years of age or older.  The average household size was 2.78 and the average family size was 3.26.

In the town, the population was spread out, with 32.4% under the age of 18, 5.6% from 18 to 24, 33.6% from 25 to 44, 23.2% from 45 to 64, and 5.3% who were 65 years of age or older.  The median age was 35 years. For every 100 females, there were 106.0 males.  For every 100 females age 18 and over, there were 98.6 males.

The median income for a household in the town was $31,250, and the median income for a family was $40,417. Males had a median income of $29,545 versus $17,500 for females. The per capita income for the town was $13,931.  About 12.5% of families and 12.4% of the population were below the poverty line, including 15.1% of those under age 18 and 47.4% of those age 65 or over.

Politics

References

Towns in Hancock County, Maine
Towns in Maine